George Adelbert "Bart" Bartholomew (June 1, 1919 – October 2, 2006) was an American biologist.  He was born in Independence, Missouri and earned his B.A. and M.A. degrees from the University of California, Berkeley.  During the Second World War he served as a physicist in the U.S. Naval Bureau of Ordnance.  He earned his PhD at Harvard University, but was associated during the rest of his long career, until his retirement in 1989, with the University of California, Los Angeles (UCLA).

He was elected a Fellow of the American Academy of Arts and Sciences in 1981 and a member of the National Academy of Sciences in 1985. Bartholomew was the inaugural (1993) recipient of the Cooper Ornithological Society’s Loye and Alden Miller Research Award, which is given in recognition of lifetime achievement in ornithological research.

Bartholomew is also recognized for the large number of prolific scientists that trained under his supervision. Specifically, 39 Ph.D. students, 5 postdoctoral researchers, and one Master’s student were trained in his lab at UCLA.  These students went on to train their own students, and as of 2005 his lineage spanned a maximum of seven generations and included nearly 1,200 individuals.  Bartholomew is so well respected among contemporary biologists that it is a source of pride to claim to be in the "Bartholomew Tree", which is to be an academic descendant of Bartholomew.

References

External links
Academic Genealogy of George Bartholomew
William R. Dawson, "George A. Bartholomew", Biographical Memoirs of the National Academy of Sciences (2011)

1919 births
2006 deaths
American ornithologists
Fellows of the American Academy of Arts and Sciences
Harvard University alumni
People from Independence, Missouri
University of California, Berkeley alumni
University of California, Los Angeles faculty
Members of the United States National Academy of Sciences
20th-century American zoologists